The 2014–15 Czech National Football League is the 22nd season of the Czech Republic's second tier football league. The season started on 2 August 2014 and ran until May 2015, with a winter break between November and March.

Team changes

From FNL

 SK Dynamo České Budějovice (promoted to 2014–15 Czech First League)
 FC Hradec Králové (promoted to 2014–15 Czech First League)
 FK Bohemians Prague (Střížkov) (relegated to 2014–15 Bohemian Football League)
 Loko Vltavín (relegated to 2014–15 Bohemian Football League)

To FNL

 SK Sigma Olomouc (relegated from 2013–14 Czech First League after 30 years in the top flight)
 1. SC Znojmo (relegated from 2013–14 Czech First League)
 FK Kolín (promoted from 2013–14 Bohemian Football League)
 SFC Opava (promoted from 2013–14 Moravian–Silesian Football League)

Team overview

League table

Results

Statistics

Goalscorers
Correct as of 23 November 2014

8 goals

 Zdeněk Folprecht (FK Viktoria Žižkov)
 Lubomír Urgela (MFK OKD Karviná)

7 goals

 Lukáš Budínský (MFK OKD Karviná)
 Marek Červenka (FK Baník Sokolov)
 Jakub Plšek (SK Sigma Olomouc)

6 goals

 Zbyněk Musiol (FC MAS Táborsko)
 Michal Ordoš (SK Sigma Olomouc)
 Jan Pázler (1. SC Znojmo FK)
 Miloslav Strnad (FC MAS Táborsko)
 Igor Súkenník (FK Viktoria Žižkov)
 Lukáš Železník (FC Fastav Zlín)
 Libor Žondra (1. SC Znojmo FK)

5 goals

 Radim Breite (FK Varnsdorf)
 Adnan Džafić (FC MAS Táborsko)
 Petr Javorek (FC MAS Táborsko)
 Martin Matúš (MFK Frýdek-Místek)
 Tomáš Smola (FK Ústí nad Labem)

See also
 2014–15 Czech First League
 2014–15 Czech Cup

References

2014–15 in Czech football
Czech National Football League seasons